Reintegrationism (Galician and ;) is the linguistic and cultural movement in Galicia which advocates for the unity of Galician and Portuguese as a single language. In other words, the movement postulates that Galician and Portuguese languages did not only share a common origin and literary tradition, but that they are in fact variants of the same language even today. According to this, Galicia should re-integrate into the Community of Portuguese Language Countries.

The opposite view holds that Portuguese and Galician should be viewed as distinct languages, which is called Isolationism.

Controversy
There are two main views in Galicia about the Galician language:

 The isolationist considers Galician and Portuguese to be two distinct languages, although they are closely related. Isolationists favour differentiated rules of writing and spelling between Galician and Portuguese. In this fashion, Galician spelling follows the model of Spanish orthography and its own traditional conventions, which converge with it in some aspects. This view is held by the majority of public and Government organizations.

 Among other criteria, isolationism argues that since the majority of the Galician population was educated in Spanish only (as official use of Galician was forbidden for centuries,     especially in Francoist Spain), it is easier to create a Galician written norm which is closer to Spanish, therefore more "familiar", regardless of other considerations. It is also alleged that since the Spanish language had such a vast influence in modern Galician its contribution should not be simply disregarded. This influence is noticeable in some aspects of Galician phonetics and colloquial speech.

 The reintegrationist view considers Galician to be a variant of a shared Galician-Portuguese linguistic diasystem, as evidenced by the common origin, grammar, syntax, vocabulary, morphology and overall high level of mutual intelligibility. Therefore, reintegrationists support the use of spelling rules similar to the ones used in Portuguese-speaking countries. This is supported by the AGAL (Galician Association of the Language), Galician Academy of the Portuguese Language, Brazilian Academy of Letters, Lisbon Academy of Sciences, and a number of civic and cultural associations both in Galicia and Portuguese-speaking countries.

 In this fashion, it is argued that Galician would be faithful to its history and etymology and subsequently its written norm would be more scientific and precise. Thus, it would allow Galician speakers to have direct access to a world culture and it would also clarify some spelling problems of the isolationist norm (for example in terms of accentuation).

 Reintegrationism is a cultural stand as much as a linguistic position. Its supporters believe that Galicia rightfully belongs to Lusophony since, in fact, modern Portuguese originated in what is today Galicia and northern Portugal (see History of Portuguese, Galician-Portuguese period). They aim for stronger cultural and economic ties with the Portuguese-speaking countries using the common language as a tool for direct communication.

 From the Portuguese side, a number of relevant linguists and authors such as Luís Lindley Cintra, Manuel Rodrigues Lapa, Fernando Venâncio, Carlos Reis or Malaca Casteleiro have expressed their agreement with the reintegrationist views.

Genesis of the debate
The divergences between isolationism and reintegrationism can be traced back to the time of the Galician  (Revival), in the nineteenth century, when Galician began to be systematically written again in Galicia for the first time since the Middle Ages. Up to that time, written Galician was either forbidden or simply dismissed by the Spanish authorities, and certainly not used officially. Hence,  Galician writers realized they did not "know" how Galician should be spelled properly. There were three possible options: to infer it from the Medieval forms; to use a Spanish-based spelling, which was already known to all; or to use the Portuguese spelling, feeling that written Portuguese was "what Galician would have been if it had not been forbidden". Authors such as Castelao, among others, stated that Galician should gradually merge with Portuguese, namely in its written form. The reality was that until the 1980s Galician was often written using a mix of the three options.

Yet, with the end of Francoist Spain in 1975, and with the Spanish transition to democracy shortly afterwards, Galicia became an autonomous community with the Statute of Autonomy of 1981, with Galician as its official language (alongside Spanish). Establishing a fixed standard form then became urgent. Still, the first draft of the language norms was produced in 1979 under the guidance of linguist Professor Ricardo Carballo Calero. These norms recommended a gradual approach to Portuguese, often allowing for a number of different solutions in the case of uncertainty.

However, political issues forced the resignation of Carvalho Calero and, consequently, the 1979 pro-reintegrationist norms were revoked. The new official norms and reforms passed from 1982 onwards would be strongly pro-isolationist.

Practicalities 
Reintegrationism accepts two possibilities for writing Galician: either adopting the standard Portuguese written norm or using a slightly modified norm following the recommendations of AGAL. In any case, reintegrationism considers that spoken Galician and all of its characteristic words, expressions, and pronunciation should not be radically substituted by standard Portuguese. The main recommendations of reintegrationism when referring to spoken Galician revolve around the avoidance of unnecessary Spanish loanwords, namely colloquialisms. In writing, the most obvious differences from the official norm (NOMIGa) are (according to AGAL):

 Use of  instead of the letter  to represent the palatal nasal sound. For example: caminho instead of camiño (way). 
For example: algumha instead of algunha.
For example: coelho instead of coello (rabbit)
For example: associaçom/associação instead of asociación and associaçons/associações instead of asociacións (association, associations)
For example: livraria instead of librería (bookshop); incrível instead of incrible or incríbel (incredible)
For example: associação instead of asociación
For example: hoje instead of hoxe (today), geral instead of xeral (general), but exército as in exército (army)
For example: som instead of son (sound)
 Use of a wider range of accentuation signs instead of the simplified single stroke. For example: português instead of portugués (Portuguese), comentário instead of comentario (commentary). Note that the official orthography, being a calque of the Spanish one in that respect, does not cater for any difference between open and closed vowels, since Spanish does not have them.
 Avoidance of specific lexical choices introduced by Spanish

Even though the reintegrationist norm does not have official status, it has been recognized in courts of law.  Furthermore, Galician members of the European Parliament (such as José Posada, Camilo Nogueira and Xosé Manuel Beiras) have used spoken Galician when addressing the chamber and have used standard Portuguese orthography to encode their Galician speech. In all cases, these interventions and encodings have been accepted by the Parliament as a valid form of Portuguese, that is, an official language of the European Union.

Furthermore, members of Galician reintegrationist associations have been regularly present at meetings of the Community of Portuguese-Speaking Countries. In 2008, Galician delegates were invited as speakers to the Portuguese Parliament when discussing the new spelling norms for Portuguese language.

Common positions 
Theoretically, the positions of the standards of NOMIGa (official norm) and AGAL are not so different. Although usually accused of having pro-Spanish tendencies, it is stated at the introduction of the NOMIGa that "standard choices must be in harmony with those of other languages, especially to those of Romance languages and especially to those of Portuguese". Furthermore, they value "the contribution of Peninsular and Brazilian Portuguese" in the creation of the Galician norm.

This being the philosophy behind the "official standard", NOMIGa and AGAL share an initial starting point, but it is often argued that the NOMIGa are far removed from the usual speech of day-to-day and older Galician speakers, in addition to "isolating" Galician (hence the term isolationist) from the rest of Portuguese-speaking areas by using a different writing system.
In any case, European and Brazilian Portuguese are usually analyzed by both isolationists and reintegrationists as a primary source from which to extract scientific and technical terminology and neologisms.

Political implications
As with many other aspects of Galician society and culture, language is deeply politicized in Galicia. Traditionally, the defence and promotion of Galician language has been linked to Galician independence, yet this is often considered a simplification. Likewise, different political groups and parties have adopted different approaches to the "isolationism vs reintegrationism" polemic. Broadly speaking, pro-independence groups have traditionally expressed a greater support for the reintegrationist norm, while others have adopted the isolationist. In any case, all the linguistic organizations behind both reintegrationism and isolationism have attempted to dissociate themselves from the political debate. For example, AGAL members have often expressed that this is merely a linguistic, hence scientific, discussion, and that it should not become the arena for political fights among the community of Galician speakers.

See also

Castrapo
Community of Portuguese Language Countries
Galician language
Galician-Portuguese
Partido da Terra
Portuguese language
Ricardo Carvalho Calero
Spanish language
Spelling reform

Notes

Further reading
Nova Proposta de Classificação dos Dialectos Galego-Portugueses, Luís F. Lindley Cintra, in Boletim de Filologia, 1971, Lisboa, Centro de Estudos Filológicos.
 A Galiza, o galego e Portugal, Manoel Rodrigues Lapa, 1979, Sá da Costa, Lisboa.
 Estudo crítico das normas ortográficas e morfolóxicas do idioma galego, AGAL 1983 and 1989, Corunha.
 Prontuário ortográfico galego, AGAL, 1985, Corunha.
 Sobre o problema da Galiza, da sua cultura e seu idioma, Manoel Rodrigues Lapa, in Agália no. 29, 1992.
A língua portuguesa da Galiza, compiled for students of Portuguese language at University College Cork, Xoán M. Paredes, 2006.
"I see my language everywhere": On linguistic relationship between Galicia and Portugal, Fernando Venâncio (conference), 2006.
O conflicto ortográfico do galego no CMI Galiza, 2006.
Reintegracionismo lingüístico: identidade e futuro para o galego from the magazine Voz Própria, 2007.
O Brasil fala a língua galega, Júlio César Barreto Rocha, Universidade Federal da Rondônia, (date unknown; 2000?).

External links
Associaçom Galega da Língua
Movimento Defesa da Língua
Associação de Amizade Galiza-Portugal
Irmandades da Fala da Galiza e Portugal
ADIGAL – reintegracionist association in Argentina
Academia Galega da Língua Portuguesa, Galician Academy of the Portuguese Language
Novas da Galiza – newspaper in AGAL norm
FAQ do Reintegracionismo – "FAQ on Reintegracionism", by Gentalha do Pichel
Conference by Professor Martinho Monteiro Santalha, where he argues for the linguistic unity of Galician and Portuguese – from minute 04:09
Amostra comparativa – comparison between Galician, Portuguese and Brazilian-Portuguese pronunciation (with sound files)
Reportagem sobre a língua galega – short documentary about Galician language on Portuguese national television (RTP); 8:21 total running time

Galician language
Portuguese language
Spelling reform
Sociolinguistics